Sir David John Cameron MacKay  (22 April 1967 – 14 April 2016) was a British physicist, mathematician, and academic. He was the Regius Professor of Engineering in the Department of Engineering at the University of Cambridge and from 2009 to 2014 was Chief Scientific Advisor to the UK Department of Energy and Climate Change (DECC). MacKay wrote the book Sustainable Energy – Without the Hot Air.

Education
MacKay was educated at Newcastle High School and represented Britain in the International Physics Olympiad in Yugoslavia in 1985, receiving the first prize for experimental work. He continued his education at Trinity College, Cambridge, and received a Bachelor of Arts degree in Natural Sciences (Experimental and theoretical physics) in 1988. He went to the California Institute of Technology (Caltech) as a Fulbright Scholar, where his supervisor was John Hopfield. He was awarded a PhD in 1992.

Career and research
In January 1992 MacKay was appointed the Royal Society Smithson Research Fellow at Darwin College, Cambridge, continuing his cross-disciplinary research in the Cavendish Laboratory, the Department of Physics of the University of Cambridge. In 1995 he was made a University Lecturer in the Cavendish Laboratory. He was promoted in 1999 to a Readership, in 2003 to a Professorship in Natural Philosophy and in 2013 to the post of Regius Professorship of Engineering.

MacKay's contributions in machine learning and information theory include the development of Bayesian methods for neural networks, the rediscovery (with Radford M. Neal) of low-density parity-check codes, and the invention of Dasher, a software application for communication especially popular with those who cannot use a traditional keyboard. He cofounded the knowledge management company Transversal. In 2003, his book  Information Theory, Inference, and Learning Algorithms was published.

His interests beyond research included the development of effective teaching methods and African development; he taught regularly at the African Institute for Mathematical Sciences in Cape Town from its foundation in 2003 to 2006. In 2008 he completed a book on energy consumption and energy production without fossil fuels called  Sustainable Energy – Without the Hot Air. MacKay used £10,000 of his own money to publish the book, and the initial print run of 5,000 sold within days. The book received praise from The Economist, The Guardian, and Bill Gates, who called it "one of the best books on energy that has been written." Like his textbook on Information theory, MacKay made the book available for free online. In March 2012 he gave a TED talk on renewable energy.

MacKay was appointed to be Chief Scientific Advisor of the Department of Energy and Climate Change, United Kingdom, in September 2009. In October 2014, at the end of his five-year term, he was succeeded by John Loughhead.

Awards and honours
MacKay was elected a Fellow of the Royal Society (FRS) in 2009. His certificate of election reads:

In the 2016 New Year Honours, MacKay was appointed a Knight Bachelor "for services to Scientific Advice in Government and Science Outreach", and therefore granted the title sir.

Personal life
David MacKay was born the fifth child of Donald MacCrimmon MacKay and Valerie MacKay. His elder brother Robert S. MacKay FRS (born in 1956) is Professor of Mathematics at the University of Warwick. David was a vegetarian.

He married Ramesh Ghiassi in 2011. They had a son and a daughter.

Illness and death 
MacKay was diagnosed with inoperable stomach cancer (malignant adenocarcinoma) in July 2015, for which he underwent palliative chemotherapy, a process he documented in detail on his public personal blog. He died in the afternoon of 14 April 2016. He is survived by his wife and two children.

References

1967 births
2016 deaths
British physicists
British information theorists
Natural philosophers
Professors of engineering (Cambridge)
Fellows of Darwin College, Cambridge
Fellows of the Royal Society
Alumni of Trinity College, Cambridge
People from Stoke-on-Trent
British non-fiction writers
People educated at Newcastle-under-Lyme School
Fellows of the Institute of Physics
California Institute of Technology alumni
British male writers
Knights Bachelor
Male non-fiction writers
Regius Professors
Fulbright alumni